Mayuri Kyatari (born 11 July 1992) is an Indian actress and model. Kyatari began her career in the Kannada serial Ashwini Nakshatra, which made her famous. She debuted in the Kannada movie Krishna Leela. Featuring in Ishtakamya, Nataraja Service and Rustum.

Early life 
Mayuri Kyatari was born to Geetha and Prakash Kyatari in Hubli, Karnataka, and was brought up there. 
After doing her schooling in Hubli St Michaels, she completed her Pre-university at Fathima College in Hubli. She graduated in commerce from Oxford college Hubli. She was also an anchor for four years during her career in the industry. She was first seen in the Kannada serial Ashwini Nakshatra, where she played role of Ashwini, wife of a superstar.

In 2015, Kyatari entered the Kannada film industry. She first signed for the Kannada Drama film Krishna Leela. The movie was successfully completed in 100 days and gave her fame enough to be cast for Nagathihalli Chandrashekhar's next film Ishtakamya, opposite to Vijay Suriya. She has worked with Sharan in a movie called Nataraja Service under Puneeth Rajkumar presentation, which has been released.

Filmography

Films

Dubbing Artist

Television

Personal life 
Mayuri married her long-time boyfriend, Arun, on 12 June 2020 at Sri Thirumalagiri Sri Lakshmi Venkateswara Swami Temple in Bengaluru.

References

External links

 

1998 births
Kannada actresses
Indian film actresses
People from Hubli
Living people
Actresses in Kannada cinema
21st-century Indian actresses